Svetlogorsk is a coastal resort town and the administrative center of Svetlogorsky District of Kaliningrad Oblast, Russia, located on the coast of the Baltic Sea on the Sambia Peninsula,  northwest of Kaliningrad. Population figures:

History
Svetlogorsk is situated in the historical region of Sambia of Prussia. It was established in 1258 as a Sambian fishermen settlement named Ruse-moter (lit. region of cellars). The Teutonic Order that conquered the land gradually corrupted the name into Rause-moter, Raushe-moter, and finally Rauschen. The order brothers set a new direction for the life of the village: they blocked off the Katzenbach stream, which flows into the lake, and installed a mill on the stream. From that time on, the lake became known as Mühlen-taich (Mill Pond), and the mill business became the main one for the inhabitants of the village. During the Order's times it was the largest mill in Sambia. In 1454, King Casimir IV Jagiellon incorporated the region to the Kingdom of Poland upon the request of the anti-Teutonic Prussian Confederation. After the subsequent Thirteen Years' War (1454–1466), the settlement was a part of Poland as a fief held by the Teutonic Knights until 1525, and by secular Ducal Prussia afterwards. From the 18th century it was part of the Kingdom of Prussia.

In the early 19th century, the place became fashionable among German vacationers. Since access to the sea was hampered by a sand dune, the picturesque corners of the lake were the place of residence and recreation. A tavern was opened near the mill, new villas and boarding houses were built. On June 24, 1820, it was officially recognized as a spa town. During his visit to Rauschen in 1840, King Frederick William IV of Prussia ordered the sea embankment to be beautified. From 1871, it was part of the German Empire. The popularity of the town as a resort has grown significantly since 1900, when a railway was built from Königsberg to Rauschen / Orth station, extended in 1906 to Rauschen / Dune station. Trains were now able to drive closer to the sea, and the resort became much more accessible for many residents of Königsberg. A positive role both in the development of the resort and in attracting tourists was played by the hippodrome opened in Rauschen by the equestrian society. The town began to divide into two parts: the lower one - near the lake, and the upper one (40–50 m higher) by the sea. The upper village was located approximately at an altitude of up to 60 m above sea level, so a pleasant event in his life was the opening in 1912 of a funicular - a 90-meter inclined railroad to deliver holidaymakers to the sea and back. The arrangement of the resort could not do without the arrangement of beach areas. In 1908, a wooden promenade-promenade deck was built on the seashore on stilts, several serpentine descents led to it. Otto Nicolai, Wilhelm von Humboldt, Käthe Kollwitz and Thomas Mann were among the celebrities who stayed there. In the early years of the 20th century, private individuals launched an intensive construction of country houses, villas, boarding houses in Rauschen, especially in the upper part of the resort.

The buildings had architectural forms with elements of half-timbered, neo-Gothic, then fashionable historicism, and fit well into the landscape. In 1928, the villa of the architect Goering (namesake of the Reichsmarschall) was built. In the center of Rauschen, becoming a kind of symbol of the city, in 1900-1908, a tower of a hydrotherapy was erected in the style of national romanticism.

Even then, in addition to water treatment: sea, carbon dioxide and other baths, the sanatorium institutions of the city practiced mud, electric and light treatment, therapeutic massage. Under the helmet-shaped roof of the tower there was an observation deck for viewing the surroundings. Some buildings of the city were built by a charitable society, which consisted of local and visiting entrepreneurs and a wealthy part of the intelligentsia. Since 1841, this charitable society, together with the resort residents, has been printing the newspaper "Hospitable Raushenets". The care of the society built, for example, a home for elderly teachers and a church erected in 1903-1907. The church was consecrated on July 7, 1907, it was built according to the project of architects Vihman and Kukuk in the neo-Romanesque style with elements of Art Nouveau. The attraction of the church was a carved wooden altar. During the First World War, Rauschen became a "branch" of the German military department — civilians were almost displaced by German officers who were being treated and resting.

On 14 April 1945, Rauschen was conquered by the Soviet Union in the course of World War II. It became a part of Kaliningrad Oblast and on 17 June 1947 was given its present name.On 16 May 1972, an Antonov An-24 crashed into the Svetlogorsk kindergarten, killing 33 people.

In 1994, an urban district was formed around it, which also included the village of Yantarny and the Primorye settlement Council. The boundaries of the district were clarified in 1999. In 2007, the Svetlogorsk city district was granted the status of a municipal district, and Svetlogorsk was defined as its administrative center, three urban settlements were formed as part of the district, including the urban settlement of the city of Svetlogorsk. In 2018, the urban settlements were merged. In 2019, Svetlogorsk was awarded the status of a city of regional significance.

Today, it is a moderately popular summer resort town thanks to its beachfront and many spas, clubs, and attractions. It has arguably the best preserved Prussian heritage and architecture amongst former Soviet towns that were once Prussian and survived the destruction of Konigsberg and other settlements from WWII.

Administrative and municipal status
Within the framework of administrative divisions, Svetlogorsk serves as the administrative center of Svetlogorsky District. As an administrative division, it is incorporated within Svetlogorsky District as the town of district significance of Svetlogorsk. As a municipal division, the town of district significance of Svetlogorsk is incorporated within Svetlogorsky Municipal District as Svetlogorskoye Urban Settlement.

Attractions 
Water Tower

An important landmark of Svetlogorsk is a water tower built in the early 20th century, belonging to a hydrotherapy clinic. It was built according to the project of the famous Prussian architect Otto Kukkuk from reinforced concrete structures. Being the tallest building of Raushen at that time, the 25-meter tower became the central point organizing the space of the city center, a kind of "town hall". The water in the hospital came from a tank, where it was previously pumped directly from the sea. Warm baths were intended mainly for those patients who could not go down to the water on their own on a steep slope. The treatment also included massage, mud and electrotherapy.

The Zodiac sundial

Zodiac sundial with a diameter of 10.1 meters. The magnificent work of the team of authors under the direction of sculptor Nikolai Pavlovich Frolov. It was installed in Svetlogorsk on the embankment in 1974 for the originality of the composition and the accuracy of the time display. The watch is even listed in the Guinness Book of Records.

Nymph

The sculpture of a beautiful young nymph girl is one of the most memorable symbols of Svetlogorsk today. The statue stands on the promenade, decorating the exit to the embankment from a long staircase leading from the city center.Sculpture created by Herman Branch “Nymph”. The author of the sculpture is the famous German sculptor Herman Brachert, who lived and worked in the village of Otradnoye for more than 10 years.

Promenade

The embankment of the promenade with a length of over 1 km is decorated with unusual sculptural compositions — a bronze statue of a mermaid surrounded by fish and a statue of a naked nymph in a mother-of-pearl shell resting on mosaic waves of turquoise hue. The space separating the sculptural forms is filled with benches with semicircular canopies to protect from the sun and rain: here you can access the Internet for free via Wi-Fi.

Frog Princess

The sculpture "Frog Princess", created by the artist Oleg Melekhov[], is a symbol of the city of modern times. An elegant and thin female figure, depicted in the form of a frog, is installed in a park near the railway station. The Frog Princess" personifies the miraculous transformations in the soul of a person who has seen the beauty of love and thereby emerged from the world of illusions. It is a symbol of incessant movement, emphasized by the plasticity of a young girl. For Svetlogorsk, sculpture has become an image of rebirth, a new stage in the life of the city.

Quiet lake

The first vacationers came here for the sake of a mild therapeutic climate and settled on the shore of the Mullenteich pond — the current lake Tikhoe. They lived in the houses of local fishermen, enjoyed nature and occasionally climbed a sand dune to get to the sea water. In the middle of the 19th century, the first hotel and cafe were already opened near the lake, and soon they began to build up the current city center, where all the infrastructure was gradually moved. And the lake remained a quiet and peaceful corner with clean air and rich coastal vegetation. 

Wheel of History

The exhibition-museum "Wheel of History" opened in Svetlogorsk on February 1, 2014, there is a permanent exhibition "Raushen - Svetlogorsk", telling about the history of the city.The exhibition presents cultural and everyday objects, rare photographs and other exhibits that tell about life, recreation, crafts and people who lived, created and loved this wonderful place on the Sambia Peninsula.

Cable car

The Svetlogorsk cable car is one of the main symbols of this resort city. With the help of it, you can climb from the sandy beach to the hills with the main urban infrastructure. If for young healthy people it is rather an attraction, then for the elderly, sick or just tired it is a necessity, because the height difference in Svetlogorsk reaches 40 m, the descent and ascent are very steep. The funicular overcomes the 175 m long path in one direction in 5 minutes, so passengers have the opportunity to take beautiful photos or just look at the city drowning in greenery. The cabins are closed, each can withstand a weight of up to 160 kg. Usually there is a queue in front of the entrance, so it's worth getting ready to wait about 15 minutes.

Transportation

References

Notes

Sources

Cities and towns in Kaliningrad Oblast
Spa towns in Russia
Svetlogorsky District